Dumb Waiters is the second studio album by English pop band the Korgis. It was released on Rialto Records in the UK in 1980.

The album peaked #40 at UK chart and includes the singles "Everybody's Got to Learn Sometime", UK #5, U.S. #18, Australia #18; "If It's Alright With You Baby" UK #56; "Dumb Waiters" and "Rover's Return".

Dumb Waiters was re-issued on CD by Edsel Records in 1999 but is currently out of print.

Track listing
Side A:
"Silent Running" (Warren) - 3:05 
"Love Ain't Too Far Away" (Davis) - 3:29 
"Perfect Hostess" (Davis) - 3:21 
"Drawn and Quartered" (Warren) - 3:20 
"Everybody's Got to Learn Sometime" (Warren) - 4:24 (N.B. 1999 CD edition includes alternate version)
Side B:
"Intimate" (Davis) - 3:08 
"It's No Good Unless You Love Me" (Warren) - 3:24 
"Dumb Waiters" (Warren) - 2:42 
"If It's Alright with You Baby" (Warren) - 4:06 
"Rover's Return" (Davis) - 3:34

Charts

Personnel
 James Warren - lead vocals, background vocals, bass guitar, electric guitar, keyboards
 Stuart Gordon - acoustic guitar, violin
 Andy Davis - electric guitar, keyboards, drums, percussion, background vocals
 Phil Harrison - keyboards, percussion

Additional personnel 
 David Lord - percussion
 Stephen Paine - programming
 Jo Mullet - background vocals
 Ali Cohn - background vocals

Production
 The Korgis - producers
 David Lord - producer, sound engineer
 Nick Heath - direction
 Tim Heath - direction
 Jeffery Edwards - cover painting
 Tim Simmons - photography
 Nick Heath, George Rowbottom - art direction
 Julian Balme - art direction
 Recorded at Crescent Studios, Bath, Somerset, England from October 1979 to March 1980.

Release history
 1980 LP Rialto Records TENOR 104 (UK)
 1980 LP Asylum Records 290 (US)
 1999 CD Edsel Records EDCD 622

Single releases
Format: 7" unless otherwise noted
 "Everybody's Got to Learn Sometime"  / "Dirty Postcards" (Rialto TREB 115, April 1980)
 "If It's Alright with You Baby" / "Love Ain't Too Far Away" (TREB 118, July 1980)
 "If It's Alright with You Baby" (Remix) - 3:46 / "Love Ain't Too Far Away" (12" TREBL 118, July 1980)
 "Dumb Waiters" / "Perfect Hostess" (TREB 122, October 1980)
 "Rovers Return" / "Wish You a Merry Christmas" (non-album track) (Warren/Harrison) - 2:53 (TREB 131, December 1980)

References

1980 albums
The Korgis albums
Asylum Records albums